Virgin is a 2003 American drama film directed by Deborah Kampmeier and starring Elisabeth Moss, Robin Wright and Daphne Rubin-Vega. It premiered at the Los Angeles Film Festival on June 14, 2003 and was later given a limited release on September 3, 2004.

Plot 
17-year-old Jessie lives in an unnamed blue-collar town with her parents and younger sister, Katie. Though she was raised Baptist by her religious family, she is rebellious and has fallen into habits of drinking and shoplifting. One night at a church dance, Jessie goes off to the woods with her crush, Shane. Unaware that Shane has put a date rape drug into her drink, Jessie gets drunk and passes out. Shane sexually assaults her while she’s unconscious. Some time after Jessie regains consciousness, she finds herself pregnant. With no memory of having had sex, she believes that she is carrying a child of God. She is shunned by her family—and eventually the whole community—when word of her claim spreads.

Cast
Elisabeth Moss as Jessie Reynolds 
Robin Wright as Mrs. Reynolds 
Daphne Rubin-Vega as Frances 
Socorro Santiago as Lorna
Peter Gerety as Mr. Reynolds
Stephanie Gatschet as Katie Reynolds
Charles Socarides as Shane
Sam Riley as Michael
Casey Wilson as girlfriend (uncredited)

Production
The film was shot in 21 days on digital video. Robin Wright’s support was an integral part of the film getting financed and produced.

Reception

Roger Ebert gave the film 3 out of 4 stars. In a positive review, TV Guide said that while the film’s symbolism can be heavy-handed, "Moss' extraordinary performance as the restless, troubled Jesse makes up for a multitude of minor flaws; it's so transparent it scarcely seems like acting at all, and gives the film a haunting power that's hard to shake off." PopMatters wrote, "Virgin'''s potential subversion lies in its demonstration of the ways U.S. ideals and expectations are literally inscribed on the body of young women. Yet the film is ultimately hopeful."
 
In a negative review, Wesley Morris of The Boston Globe wrote, "So much of Virgin is bunk masquerading as sexual politics. It could have been a truly provocative work of religious devotion but settles for weakly held feminist positions that make Christianity look like the scariest religion ever." He also argued the film doesn’t quite know what it wants to be, commenting the premise "sounds like the start of a John Waters movie, only [the film] is not a comedy. It also evokes something by Carl Dreyer, but [the film] is not that pious." Scott Tobias of The A.V. Club opined, "A truly courageous movie might have taken Moss' character at her word and followed through on the premise of a 21st-century Virgin Mary."

On review aggregate website Rotten Tomatoes, Virgin'' has an approval rating of 38% based on 21 reviews.

Awards and nominations

Won
Hamptons International Film Festival 2003: Best Screenplay: Deborah Kampmeier
Nashville Film Festival 2003: 2nd place Dreammaker Award: Deborah Kampmeier
Santa Fe Film Festival 2003: Milagro Award : Best Independent Spirit: Deborah Kampmeier
Sedona International Film Festival 2004: Director's Choice Award: Best Actress: Elisabeth Moss
Toronto Female Eye Film Festival 2003: Jury Award: Best Feature Film: Deborah Kampmeier

Nominated
Golden Starfish Award: Best Fiction Feature Film/Video: Deborah Kampmeier
Independent Spirit Awards 2004
Best Female Lead: Elisabeth Moss
John Cassavetes Award: Deborah Kampmeier (writer/director) and Sarah Schenck (producer)

References

External links 
 
 
 

2003 films
2000s English-language films
2003 drama films
2000s American films
American drama films
Teenage pregnancy in film
American independent films
2003 independent films
Films about rape
Films about Christianity
Films about dysfunctional families